Lieutenant-Colonel Anthony John Muirhead MC & Bar TD (4 November 1890 – 29 October 1939) was a Conservative Party politician in the United Kingdom. Educated at Eton College, The Royal Military Academy at Woolwich
and then at Magdalen College, He was elected at the 1929 general election as Member of Parliament (MP) for Wells in Somerset, and held the seat until his death in 1939, aged 48.

Earlier military career
Muirhead served in the Queen's Own Oxfordshire Hussars in the First World War, reaching the rank of captain, being awarded the Military Cross in 1917 and a Bar while serving as brigade major of the 119th Infantry Brigade at Armentières in the closing days of the war in 1918. He was promoted to brevet major in 1919.

In 1924 he transferred to the 100th (Worcestershire and Oxfordshire Yeomanry) Field Brigade, Royal Field Artillery (Territorial Army) and was granted the full rank of major. In 1933 he was promoted brevet lieutenant-colonel. In 1936 he was promoted to full lieutenant-colonel commanding the brigade. In 1939, he transferred to the 53rd Anti-Tank Regiment.

Political career
In the National Government of Prime Minister Neville Chamberlain, he held junior ministerial office as Under-Secretary of State for Air from 1937 to 1938, and as Parliamentary Under-Secretary for India and Burma from 1938 to 1939.

Death
Muirhead committed suicide in 1939, purportedly out of fear that his leg injury would prevent him from seeing active service during the Second World War. He was buried in the churchyard at Great Haseley, Oxfordshire.

References

External links

 
Lives From The Haseley War Memorial

1890 births
1939 deaths
British Army personnel of World War I
British military personnel who committed suicide
British politicians who committed suicide
Conservative Party (UK) MPs for English constituencies
Foreign Office personnel of World War II
Ministers in the Chamberlain peacetime government, 1937–1939
Queen's Own Oxfordshire Hussars officers
Recipients of the Military Cross
Royal Artillery officers
Suicides in England
UK MPs 1929–1931
UK MPs 1931–1935
UK MPs 1935–1945